The Oostanaula River (pronounced "oo-stuh-NA-luh") is a principal tributary of the Coosa River, about  long, formed by the confluence of the Conasauga and Coosawattee in northwestern Georgia in the United States. Via the Coosa and Alabama rivers, it is part of the watershed of the Mobile River, which flows to the Gulf of Mexico.

Etymology
Folklore explanations for its name state that Oostanaula is derived from a Cherokee language term meaning "rock that bars the way". Other similar explanations include "shoally river", and "a rock ledge across a stream".

Course
The Oostanaula River is formed in northern Gordon County, Georgia, by the confluence of the Conasauga and Coosawattee rivers, and flows generally south-southwestwardly through Gordon and Floyd counties, past the towns of Resaca and Calhoun.  It joins the Etowah River in Downtown Rome to form the Coosa River.

Tributaries
Alan Creek
Conasauga River
Coosawattee River
Johns Creek

Variant names
According to the GNIS, the river has also been known as:
Estanola River
Estanole River
Oostenauleh River
Oostennallah River
Oostinawley River
Oustanale River
Oustanalee River
Ustanali River

On this 1796 map the river is labelled "Eastanallee R."

See also
List of Georgia rivers

References

 Columbia Gazetteer of North America entry
 

Rivers of Georgia (U.S. state)
Rivers of Floyd County, Georgia
Rivers of Gordon County, Georgia
ACT River Basin
Georgia placenames of Native American origin